Rama Rama, Kya Hai Dramaa is a Bollywood comedy film directed by Chandrakant Singh, and produced by Surendra Bhatia and Rajan Prakash. The film stars Rajpal Yadav, Neha Dhupia, Aashish Chaudhary and Amrita Arora in lead roles. It was released on 1 February 2008 and received a generally negative response upon release.

Plot
The story revolves around Santosh (Rajpal Yadav) who is married to Shanti (Neha Dhupia). Santosh works at a bank in Mumbai and is a very simple man. However, his simplicity and lack of tactfulness often see him engage in domestic altercations with Shanti. The regular fights start taking their toll on Santosh's work life, also where he is often looked down by his boss Prem (Aashish Chaudhary) who is always bragging about how smooth his own married life is and how understanding his wife Khushi (Amrita Arora) is. But the reality is that his wife also nags him a lot and he is as disturbed at times as Santosh.

The film takes many twists and turns including many scenes in which Santosh imagines that he is the boyfriend or husband of other random women. In the end, this lands him in trouble with the police but finally, when Shanti bails him out, the two come to terms with each other and realize that such things are a normal part of every marriage and they must learn to live with it.

Cast
 Neha Dhupia as Shanti Singh
 Amrita Arora as Khushi Bhatia
 Rajpal Yadav as Santosh Singh
 Aashish Chaudhary as Prem Bhatia
 Anupam Kher as Vishwas Khurana
 Rati Agnihotri as Shraddha
 Sanjay Mishra as Mishraji
 Mona Thiba as Shivani
 Razak Khan as Abdul (Rickshaw driver)
 Deepak Shirke as Police Inspector
 Alan Kapoor as Vicky
 Pankaj Kalra

Soundtrack 
 Rama Rama Kya Hai Drama - Adnan Sami
 Khwabo Se Nikal Ke - Alisha Chinai
 Dekha Tujhe Sau Martaba - K.K.
 Lajja Lajja - Khushboo Jain
 Yeh Faasle - Adnan Sami

References

External links

Flop Bollywood Movies Of 2008

2000s Hindi-language films